The British Motor Museum in Warwickshire, England holds the world's largest collection of historic British cars, with over 300 cars on display from the British Motor Industry Heritage Trust and the Jaguar Heritage Trust.

History
The creation of the British Leyland Motor Corporation (BL) in 1968 saw the bringing together of multiple motor vehicle companies and marques (Austin, Jaguar, Morris, MG, Riley, Rover, Standard Triumph, and Wolseley). With many of the companies having their own collections of historic vehicles, in 1975 a centralised Leyland Historic Vehicles department was created to manage these. As the collection got ever larger, in 1983 BL created charitable trusts to ensure that these important collections, not only of vehicles, but of company archives too, would be preserved for the nation. The British Motor Industry Heritage Trust (BMIHT) was created, and under its umbrella, so were the Austin Rover Group Heritage Trust and the Jaguar Daimler Heritage Trust. In 1990, following the acquisition of Jaguar by Ford, the Jaguar Daimler Heritage Trust collection was moved to the Jaguar Browns Lane plant in Coventry. The Austin Rover Group Heritage Trust, which with the company by then having morphed into the Rover Group, became the Rover Group Trust, transferred its collection in its entirety to the BMIHT.

The collection, some of which was located at Syon Park, London, and the remainder being kept at Studley Castle, Warwickshire, continued to grow, and the BMIHT decided that a new building was required to house it all. The trust's complete collection, which included more than 25 vehicles, was relocated to the new centre.

The museum became a Designated Collection when it was added to the "exceptional cultural collections" of the Arts Council England in December 2014.

In 2015, the museum was temporarily closed for a £1.1 million refurbishment and rebranding to take place. Additionally, a new £4 million two-storey Collection Centre was built to house the reserve collection of the trust. The museum was reopened on 13 February 2016 as the British Motor Museum. The new Collection Centre houses about 250 extra vehicles, and is used for both BMIHT and Jaguar Heritage Trust (formerly the Jaguar Daimler Heritage Trust) cars.

Following Jaguar's decision to close their Jaguar Heritage Centre, a small selection of the Jaguar Heritage Collection has been on display at the Museum.

In 2003 more than sixty cars from the collection were auctioned off by the British Motor Industry Heritage Trust; over forty more cars were sold off from the museum in 2006.

Vehicles in the collection

This is not an exhaustive list — a complete list is provided on the centre's website.  Due to space limitations, not all cars are exhibited at all times.

The very first Land Rover (1948)
The first and last production models of the Land Rover Freelander
Various Land Rover, Range Rover, and Rover P5 vehicles used by the British Royal Family and senior politicians
An SAS Land Rover
Prototype Land Rover 101 Recovery Truck
Shaun the Sheep Land Rover Defender
Land Rover Series 2 track wheeled off-road vehicle
Rare Land Rover Llama lorry
The millionth Land Rover Discovery 4
The first and last production models of the Rover 75
Rover Gas Turbine cars
The Metro 1.3 HLS as shown at the 1980 Motor Show
Metro 6R4 Rally Car
Various MG Speed Record cars
The first Mini produced: 621 AOK
The last Rover Mini Cooper produced (2000)
The Minis that won the Monte Carlo Rally during the 1960s
Various Mini based prototypes, such as the Minissima
FAB1 from the Thunderbirds film
An Ascari KZ1 show car from 2000
Rolls-Royce Phantom
The last Aston Martin DB7
Aston Martin V12 Vanquish
Sinclair C5
Ford RS200
 The last production Austin Montego
Ford Escort Mark I as used in the 1970 London to Mexico World Cup Rally
Jaguar R1 Formula One racecar from 2000
Nuffield Gutty prototype

Research services
The British Motor Museum offers a research and registry service for several British car marques. The Archive houses authentic historical records by many of the major car manufacturers, including a range of original factory ledgers which record the details of individual vehicles as they came off the production line. For a small fee, owners may send in their Vehicle Identification Number (VIN - aka chassis number) and/or engine numbers, and they will research the original production records for that vehicle and send back whatever information on the vehicle is available. This is a 'Certified Copy of a Factory Record' or more commonly known as a Heritage Certificate. This can include such details as a list of the options the car was ordered with, the original paint colour and any identification numbers that may be missing. This can be useful when applying for tax exemption or to obtain an age-related Registration Mark.

References

External links

 British Motor Museum
 Classic Car Collection Gaydon Series of photos of the classic cars at the British Motor Museum

Transport museums in England
Museums in Warwickshire
Automobile museums in England